The following lists events that happened during 1915 in Australia.

Incumbents

Monarch – George V
Governor-General – Ronald Munro-Ferguson
Prime Minister – Andrew Fisher (until 27 October), then Billy Hughes
Chief Justice – Samuel Griffith

State premiers
Premier of New South Wales – William Holman
Premier of Queensland – Digby Denham (until 1 June), then Thomas Ryan
Premier of South Australia – Archibald Peake (until 2 April), then Crawford Vaughan
Premier of Tasmania – John Earle
Premier of Victoria – Alexander Peacock
Premier of Western Australia – John Scaddan

State governors
Governor of New South Wales – Gerald Strickland
Governor of Queensland – Hamilton Goold-Adams (from 15 March)
Governor of South Australia – Henry Galway
Governor of Tasmania – William Ellison-Macartney
Governor of Victoria – Arthur Stanley
Governor of Western Australia – Harry Barron

Events
 25 April – The Anzac tradition begins during World War I with a landing at Gallipoli on the Turkish coast.
 30 April – Australian submarine AE2 sunk in Sea of Marmara.
6 June – The BHP steelworks opens in Newcastle, New South Wales.
19 July – Albert Jacka becomes the first Australian to win the Victoria Cross during World War I.
9 August – Alexander Burton died at Lone Pine, Gallipoli, Turkey.  He was awarded the Victoria Cross.
24 August – The town of Holbrook was renamed from Germanton.
10 October – Twenty six men left Gilgandra on the Cooee March; the first of the World War I Snowball marches.  At each town on the route they shouted "cooee" to attract recruits; the march arrived in Sydney on 12 November with 263 recruits.
27 October – Billy Hughes becomes the seventh Prime Minister of Australia and the first to serve consecutive terms in office.
20 December – Completion of ANZAC evacuation from Gallipoli before dawn.
Full date unknown:
Zaara Street Power Station is commissioned in Newcastle, New South Wales.

Science and technology
10 December – Father and son scientists William Henry Bragg and William Lawrence Bragg win the Nobel Prize in Physics.

Arts and literature

Sport
 Patrobas wins the Melbourne Cup
 1914/15 the Sheffield Shield was won by Victoria; after this season it was not contested due to the war.
 The 1915 NSWRFL Premiership is won by Balmain.

Births
6 February – Donald Friend (died 1989), artist, writer and diarist
2 March – John Wear Burton (died 2010), public servant and diplomat
3 March – Manning Clark (died 1991), historian
6 March – Mary Ward (died 2021), actress
22 March – Charlotte Anderson (died 2002), professor of paediatrics
9 April – Bob Quinn (died 2008), SANFL footballer (Port Adelaide)
30 May – Michael Thwaites (died 2005), poet, academic and intelligence officer
31 May – Judith Wright (died 2000), poet
3 June – Jim McClelland (died 1999), senator and government minister
20 June – Dick Reynolds (died 2002), VFL footballer (Essendon)
16 July – David Campbell (died 1979), poet
3 August – Arthur John Birch (died 1995), organic chemist
26 October – Lindsay Pryor (died 1998), botanist
2 November – May Campbell (died 1981), field hockey player
25 November – Ron Hamence (died 2010), cricketer
29 November – Bob Cotton (died 2006), senator and government minister
31 December – John Murray (died 2009), politician

Deaths

 11 January – James Wilkinson, Queensland politician (b. 1854)
 11 March – Thomas Alexander Browne, author (born in the United Kingdom) (b. 1826)
 4 April – Sir Francis Bathurst Suttor, New South Wales politician and pastoralist (b. 1839)
 19 April – Thomas Playford II, 17th Premier of South Australia (born in the United Kingdom) (b. 1837)
 25 April - William Henry Strahan, writer and soldier (b. 1869)
 2 June – George Randell, Western Australian politician (born in the United Kingdom) (b. 1830)
 25 June – Frederick Manson Bailey, botanist (born in the United Kingdom) (b. 1827)
 28 June – Victor Trumper, cricketer (b. 1877)
 18 July – George Marshall-Hall, composer and poet (born in the United Kingdom) (b. 1862)
 2 August – Sir John Downer, 16th Premier of South Australia (b. 1843)
 8 October – E. Phillips Fox, impressionist painter (b. 1865)
 29 October – Richard Edwards, Queensland politician (born in the United Kingdom) (d. 1915)
 20 November – Robert Barr Smith, businessman and philanthropist (born in the United Kingdom) (b. 1824)
 4 December – George Richards, New South Wales politician (b. 1865)
 21 December – Thomas Sergeant Hall, geologist and biologist (b. 1858)

References

 
Australia
Years of the 20th century in Australia